Ronald J. Johnson (born September 21, 1958) is a former American football wide receiver who played five seasons with the Philadelphia Eagles of the National Football League. He was drafted by the Seattle Seahawks in the seventh round of the 1981 NFL Draft. He first enrolled at Monterey Peninsula College before transferring to California State University, Long Beach. Johnson attended Monterey High School in Monterey, California. He was also a member of the Hamilton Tiger-Cats and Portland Breakers.

References

External links
Just Sports Stats
College stats

Living people
1958 births
Players of American football from California
American football wide receivers
Canadian football wide receivers
African-American players of American football
African-American players of Canadian football
Monterey Peninsula Lobos football players
Long Beach State 49ers football players
Hamilton Tiger-Cats players
Boston/New Orleans/Portland Breakers players
Philadelphia Eagles players
Sportspeople from Monterey, California
21st-century African-American people
20th-century African-American sportspeople